Cavihemiptilocera is a monotypic snout moth genus described by Herbert H. Neunzig in 2006. Its single species, Cavihemiptilocera exoleta, described by Philipp Christoph Zeller in 1881, was found in Colombia.

References
 Neunzig, H. H. (2006) "Cavihemiptilocera, A New Genus for Myelois exoleta Zeller (Lepidoptera: Pyralidae: Phycitinae)". Journal of the Lepidopterists' Society. 60 (2): 79-81.

Phycitinae
Monotypic moth genera
Pyralidae genera